"Rock Your Baby" is the debut single by George McCrae. Written and produced by Harry Wayne Casey and Richard Finch of KC and the Sunshine Band, "Rock Your Baby" was one of the landmark recordings of early disco music. A massive international hit, the song reached number one on the Billboard Hot 100 singles chart in the United States, spending two weeks at the top in July 1974, number one on the R&B singles chart, and repeating the feat on the UK Singles Chart, spending three weeks at the top of the chart in July 1974. Having sold 11 million copies, it is one of the fewer than 40 all-time singles to have sold 10 million (or more) physical copies worldwide.

The backing track for the record was recorded in 45 minutes as a demo and featured guitarist Jerome Smith of KC and the Sunshine Band, with Casey on keyboards and Finch on bass and drums. It was also one of the first records to use a drum machine, an early Roland rhythm machine. The track was not originally intended for McCrae but he happened to be in the studio, added a vocal and the resulting combination of infectious rhythm and falsetto vocals made it a hit. Music critic Robert Christgau has described the song as "irresistibly Memphis-cum-disco-with-a-hook".

The chord progression of John Lennon's number-one single "Whatever Gets You thru the Night", released a few months later, bears a great resemblance to the one found in "Rock Your Baby". Lennon later admitted to using the song as an inspiration. ABBA's Benny Andersson and Björn Ulvaeus have also cited the song as an inspiration for the backing track of their 1976 smash hit "Dancing Queen". The song was covered by indie rock band The House of Love for the 1992 compilation album Ruby Trax. In the same year, the British dance group KWS' cover of "Rock Your Baby" reached number eight in the UK Singles Chart.

Chart performance

Weekly charts

Year-end charts

Certifications

Answer song
George's wife, Gwen McCrae, recorded an answer song to "Rock Your Baby", released just less than a year later. "Rockin' Chair" reached number nine on the U.S. Billboard Hot 100 in mid-1975. "Rockin' Chair' also reached number one R&B. George provided backing vocals on the song.

Rock Your Baby (Frankfurt Mix)

In 1987, a remix version was released, which was mixed by Paul Hardcastle. Compared to the original, this remix is adapted to the 1980s. This version is also included in the compilation Super Power Hit Sensation.

Track listing
12" Maxi
 Rock Your Baby [Frankfurt Mix] - 5:25	
 Ooh Baby - 3:57

Charts

KWS version

In August 1992, British dance music act KWS released their version of the song that appeared on the album KWS. Their version charted within the top 10 in Ireland and the United Kingdom, peaking at numbers six and eight, respectively. In Australia and New Zealand, the single entered the top 40.

Track listing
CD maxi
 "Rock Your Baby" (Boogaloo Investigator mix) – 3:29	
 "Rock Your Baby" (Thumb A Ride mix) – 5:19	
 "A Different Man" (Bubblegum Breakthrough mix) – 3:42	
 "Game Boy" (Rhythmatic remix) – 5:37

Charts

Weekly charts

Year-end charts

See also
Ace Tone
Electronic music

References

1974 songs
1974 debut singles
1987 singles
1992 singles
George McCrae songs
KWS (band) songs
Ariola Records singles
Billboard Hot 100 number-one singles
Cashbox number-one singles
Disco songs
Number-one singles in Belgium
Number-one singles in Italy
Number-one singles in Germany
Number-one singles in Norway
RPM Top Singles number-one singles
Number-one singles in Sweden
Number-one singles in Switzerland
Songs written by Harry Wayne Casey
Songs written by Richard Finch (musician)
TK Records singles
UK Singles Chart number-one singles